Gierałt - is a Polish coat of arms. It was used by several szlachta families in the times of the Polish–Lithuanian Commonwealth.

History

Family History can be found on the Geralt website: http://www.tropie.tarnow.opoka.org.pl/gieralt_luslawice.htm

Blazon

Notable bearers
Notable bearers of this coat of arms include:

See also
 Polish heraldry
 Heraldry
 Coat of Arms
 List of Polish nobility coats of arms

Sources 
 Ornatowski.com
 Dynastic Genealogy 

Polish coats of arms